is a Japanese professional football club based in Kashiwa, Chiba Prefecture, part of the Greater Tokyo Area. The club plays in the J1 League, which is the top tier of football in the country. Their home stadium is Sankyo Frontier Kashiwa Stadium, also known as "Hitachidai". Reysol is a portmanteau of the Spanish words Rey and Sol, meaning "Sun King". The name alludes to their parent company Hitachi, whose name means "rising sun" in Japanese. The club was formed in 1940 and was a founding member ("Original Eight"). of the Japan Soccer League (JSL) in 1965. Since the league's inception, they have spent nice in the top tier of Japanese football. They have been Japanese League champions twice in 1972 and 2011, and have won three League Cups in 1976, 1999 and 2013, and three Emperor's Cups in 1972, 1975 and 2012.

History

Hitachi SC (1939–1992)
The club started in 1939 and was officially formed as the company team, Hitachi, Ltd. Soccer Club in 1940 in Kodaira, Tokyo. The club formed the Japan Soccer League (JSL) in 1965, along with today's Urawa Reds, JEF United Chiba, Cerezo Osaka, Sanfrecce Hiroshima and three other clubs ("Original Eight"). They had some successes during the mid-1970s, winning several Emperor's Cups and JSL titles and contributing several players to the Japanese national team.

The club relocated from Kodaira to Kashiwa in 1986, but it took a while to adapt to the new town, as they were relegated to the JSL Division 2 at the season's closing. They made it back to the top flight in 1989/90, but dropped back in 1990/91 and returned again in 1991/92. As the J.League advent had come too soon for them, the club abandoned to be a founding member of the newly formed professional league. The club joined the Japan Football League (called "former JFL") Division 1 in 1992, the second tier of the Japanese football hierarchy following the J.League.

Kashiwa Reysol (1993–) 
The club changed its name to Kashiwa Reysol in 1993. Reysol added Careca of the Brazil national football team in the autumn of this year with the aim of winning the JFL champion for promoting to the J1 League. The club struggled, however, with the help of Careca and Brazilian manager Zé Sérgio, they secured the 2nd place in the JFL in 1994 and earned promotion to the top league.

Reysol debuted in the J1 League in 1995. They welcomed Akira Nishino in 1998 who was the former manager of Japan's Olympic team, Hristo Stoichkov of the Bulgaria national football team, and Hong Myung-bo of the Korea national football team. The club won the J.League Cup in 1999, their first title as Kashiwa Reysol.

However, next English manager, Steve Perryman, unsettled the team and the club struggled over the next several seasons. After finishing at the 16th place out of 18 clubs in 2005, the club lost the promotion/relegation play-offs against Ventforet Kofu, the 3rd place of the J2 League, and relegated to the J2 League.

A new manager, Nobuhiro Ishizaki, led an almost entirely new squad in 2006 and the club secured automatic promotion to the J1 League in the last game of the season.

The club was relegated again at the end of 2009. However, once they won the J2 League led by Nelsinho Baptista in 2010 and came back to the top flight, the club won the J1 League in 2011 with some talented footballers such as Hiroki Sakai, Junya Tanaka, Jorge Wagner and Leandro Domingues, and became the first Japanese club to win the second tier and the top tier two seasons in a row. The club qualified for the FIFA Club World Cup as the host nation's league champion and became semifinalist after defeating Auckland City and Monterrey.

For the period of 2010 through 2014, Reysol won six different titles for five consecutive seasons; the J2 League in 2010, the J1 League in 2011, the Emperor's Cup and the Super Cup in 2012, the J.League Cup in 2013 and the Suruga Bank Championship in 2014.

Rivalries

Marunouchi Gosanke 
Historically, Kashiwa Reysol's fiercest rivals have been JEF United Chiba and Urawa Reds, both close neighbors. The three were co-founders of the Japan Soccer League (JSL) in 1965, and spent most seasons in the top tier through the JSL era. Because of their former parent companies' headquarters being all based in Marunouchi, Tokyo, the three clubs were known as the Marunouchi Gosanke (丸の内御三家, "Marunouchi Big Three") and fixtures among them were known as the Marunouchi derbies.

Chiba derby 
Reysol and JEF United Chiba first met in 1941 in ancient Kanto regional football league. The two clubs both now based in Chiba Prefecture, and their rivalry is known as the Chiba derby. They annually contest a pre-season friendly match well known as the Chibagin Cup (i.e., Chiba Bank Cup) since 1995.

Others 
Reysol also has a rivalry with Kashima Antlers (commonly called Tonegawa clásico), FC Tokyo (commonly called Kanamachi derby) and Omiya Ardija (commonly called Nodasen derby).

Anthem 
Kashiwa Reysol's anthem is We Are Reysol, which is sung by anime singer Hironobu Kageyama. The song released in 1994, the same year Reysol got promoted to J1.

Record as J.League member 

Key

Honours

League
JSL Division 1 (1965–1992) / J1 League (1993–present) (first tier)
Champions: 1972, 2011

JSL Division 2 (1972–1992) / JFL Division 1 (1992–1998) / J2 League (1999–present) (second tier)
Champions: 1990–91, 2010, 2019

Cups
Emperor's Cup (1921–present)
Winners: 1972, 1975, 2012

JSL Cup (1976–1991) / J.League Cup (1992–present)
Winners: 1976, 1999, 2013

Japanese Super Cup (1977–1984, 1994–present)
Winners: 2012

All Japan Works Football Championship (1948–1964)
Winners: 1958, 1960

All Japan Inter-City Football Championship (1955–1964)
Winners: 1963

International
Suruga Bank Championship (2008–present)
Winners (1): 2014

League history 
Division 1 (JSL): 1965–1971 (as Hitachi SC)
Division 1 (JSL Div. 1): 1972 to 1986–87
Division 2 (JSL Div. 2): 1987–88 to 1988–89
Division 1 (JSL Div. 1): 1989–90
Division 2 (JSL Div. 2): 1990–91
Division 1 (JSL Div. 1): 1991–92
Division 2 (former JFL Div. 1): 1992–1993
Division 2 (former JFL): 1994 (as Kashiwa Reysol)
Division 1 (J.League): 1995–1998
Division 1 (J1): 1999–2005
Division 2 (J2): 2006
Division 1 (J1): 2007–2009
Division 2 (J2): 2010
Division 1 (J1): 2011–2018
Division 2 (J2): 2019
Division 1 (J1): 2020–present

Current squad

Out on loan

Reserve squad (U-18s)

Club captains

Coaching staff 
For the 2023 season.

Managerial history

 Kit and colours 
 Colours 

Kashiwa Reysol's main colour is yellow, like sunshine that is based on the club's name "Sun King". The uniform is yellow-black (called Aurinegro'' in Spanish) reminiscent of Peñarol or Borussia Dortmund. Reysol is the only top division club in the country to wear yellow-black.

Kit evolution

Continental record

Notes

References

External links

 
 
 
FIFA Profile

 
J.League clubs
Japan Soccer League clubs
Football clubs in Japan
Association football clubs established in 1940
Hitachi
Emperor's Cup winners
Japanese League Cup winners
Sports teams in Chiba Prefecture
1940 establishments in Japan
Japan Football League (1992–1998) clubs
Kashiwa